Mastodon is 9×LP box set by the American heavy metal band of the same name. It features all of their material released by Relapse Records plus Blood Mountain which was originally released on Reprise Records. The set is limited to 1,000 copies and all records were pressed on 180 gram vinyl.

Content
The box set contains the following audio:
Lifesblood
Remission
Live from the Relapse Contamination Festival 2003 (previously unreleased)
Leviathan (includes cover versions of Thin Lizzy's "Emerald", Melvins' "The Bit" and Metallica's "Orion")
Call of the Mastodon
Blood Mountain

Also included are:
Mastodon turntable slip-mat
Patch
Sticker set

Personnel
Mastodon
Brann Dailor – drums, vocals on "Battle at Sea"
Brent Hinds – guitar, vocals
Bill Kelliher – guitar
Troy Sanders – bass, vocals

Others
Matt Washburn – production, editing, mixing, mastering
Matt Bayles – production, engineering

References

External links
Mastodon box set release page on Discogs

2008 compilation albums
Relapse Records compilation albums
Mastodon (band) albums